Natália Prekopová (born 31 May 1989) is a former Slovak biathlete.

Career

Prekopová competed in the 2010 Winter Olympics for Slovakia. She finished 13th as a part of the Slovakian women's relay team.

As of February 2013, her best performance at the Biathlon World Championships is 13th, as part of the Slovakian women's relay team, in 2009. Her best individual result at the Biathlon World Championships is 68th, in the 2009 sprint.

As of February 2013, Prekopová's best result at a Biathlon World Cup event is 9th, achieved twice with the Slovakian women's relay team and mixed relay teams. Her best individual performance in a Biathlon World Cup event is 56th, in the sprint at Kontiolahti in 2009/10.

Prekopová retired from biathlon after the end of the 2015–16 season.

References 

1989 births
Biathletes at the 2010 Winter Olympics
Slovak female biathletes
Living people
Olympic biathletes of Slovakia
Universiade medalists in biathlon
People from Ilava
Sportspeople from the Trenčín Region
Universiade gold medalists for Slovakia
Competitors at the 2013 Winter Universiade